Richard Molinas (17 November 1911 – 1975) was a British stage and film actor. A character actor, he appeared in a number of supporting roles in postwar British cinema as well as occasional television appearances.

Filmography

References

Bibliography 
 James Robert Parish & Michael R. Pitts. Hollywood on Hollywood. Scarecrow Press, 1978.

External links 
 

1911 births
1975 deaths
British male film actors
People from London